Fada N'Gourma Airport  is a public use airport located 1 nm south-southeast of Fada N'Gourma, Gourma, Burkina Faso.

See also
List of airports in Burkina Faso

References

External links 
 Airport record for Fada N'Gourma Airport at Landings.com

Airports in Burkina Faso
Gourma Province